David Hopton (died 1492) was a Canon of Windsor from 1472 to 1492.

Career

He was appointed:
Clerk of the King's Closet
Prebendary of Beaminster Prima in Salisbury 1483
Prebendary of Bitton in Salisbury 1490
Rector of Bletchley 1473

He was appointed to the eighth stall in St George's Chapel, Windsor Castle in 1472 and held the canonry until 1492.

Notes 

1492 deaths
Canons of Windsor
Year of birth unknown